Jean-Pierre Hogue (24 November 1927 – 17 June 2012) was a member of the House of Commons of Canada from 1988 to 1993. He was born in Montreal, Quebec. By career, he was a psychologist, professor and writer.

Political career
He was elected in the 1988 federal election at the Outremont electoral district for the Progressive Conservative Party.  It was speculated that he won due to the support of ultra-conservative Hasidic Jews abandoning Liberal incumbent Lucie Pépin due to her support for abortion.  He was the first non-Liberal Member of Parliament elected since the riding's creation in 1935. He served in the 34th Canadian Parliament until the 1993 federal election, at which time he was heavily defeated by Liberal Martin Cauchon.  Hogue only finished third, with just under nine percent of the vote.

Hogue was the guest speaker at the 47th Annual Serbian Day on 28 June 1992 in Niagara Falls, Ontario.

References

External links

Mention of Jean-Pierre Hogue's death 

1927 births
2012 deaths
Members of the House of Commons of Canada from Quebec
Politicians from Montreal
Progressive Conservative Party of Canada MPs